Katharine Mary Adela Maddison, née Tindal (15 December 1862 – 12 June 1929), usually known as Adela Maddison, was a British composer of operas, ballets, instrumental music and songs. She was also a concert producer. She composed a number of French songs in the style of mélodies; for some years she lived in Paris, where she was a pupil, friend and possibly lover of Gabriel Fauré. Subsequently, living in Berlin, she composed a German opera which was staged in Leipzig. On returning to England she created works for Rutland Boughton's Glastonbury Festivals.

Biography
She was born at 42 York Terrace, Regent's Park, London on 15 December 1862 (rather than in 1866 as is sometimes stated), the daughter of Vice Admiral Louis Symonds Tindal (1811–76) and Henrietta Maria O'Donel Whyte (1831/2–1917). Her grandfather was the judge Nicholas Conyngham Tindal. She seems to have been raised in London. On 14 April 1883 she married barrister and former footballer Frederick Brunning Maddison (1849–1907), at Christ Church, Lancaster Gate, London. They had two children, Diana Marion Adela and Noel Cecil Guy, born in 1886 and 1888 respectively. Her first published works date from 1882. Twelve Songs in 1895 marked the emergence of a distinctive style.

From around 1894, Maddison and her husband played a major part in encouraging and facilitating Fauré's entry onto the London musical scene. Her husband was now working for a music publishing company, Metzler, which obtained a contract to publish Fauré's music during 1896–1901. She provided English translations of some of his mélodies, and of his choral work La naissance de Vénus, Op. 29; Fauré used the latter translation in 1898, when he conducted a choir of 400 at the Leeds Festival. Fauré was a friend of the family and in 1896 vacationed at their residence in Saint-Lunaire, Brittany. She became Fauré's pupil, and he thought her a gifted composer. She composed a number of mélodies, setting the works of poets such as Sully Prudhomme, Coppée, Verlaine and Samain; in 1900 Fauré told the latter that her treatment of his poem Hiver was masterly.

During 1898 –  1905, she lived in Paris without her husband; Fauré's biographer Robert Orledge believes there was a romantic liaison with Fauré, who dedicated his Nocturne No. 7, Op. 74, to her in 1898; this piece was expressive of his feelings towards her, according to Orledge. Fauré gave her the nocturne's manuscript; it is now in the Bibliothèque nationale de France. In Paris she was also acquainted with Delius, Debussy and Ravel, and produced performances of her own works and those of others. She hosted the first performance of Delius's opera Koanga in March 1899 at her residence there, attended by Prince Edmond de Polignac and the Princesse de Polignac. Fauré was among the performers.

From Paris she moved to Berlin, where she continued to produce concerts, and composed an opera, Der Talisman, which was staged in Leipzig in 1910. In Germany she started a lifelong friendship with Martha Mundt, the editor of a Berlin socialist journal. Born in 1872, Mundt came from Königsberg; she had studied sociology and economics there and in Berlin, Genoa and Rome. Music historian Sophie Fuller believes it is quite likely the relationship between the two women was a lesbian one. They left Germany for France, where Mundt obtained work with the Princesse de Polignac, and they moved on to London when World War I started. Their friends in England included Radclyffe Hall and Mabel Batten. Mundt returned to Berlin sometime during the war.

Maddison moved to Glastonbury, Somerset and spent a number of years in the production of works for the Glastonbury Festivals of that era. These included the ballet The Children of Lir, which was subsequently staged in 1920 at the Old Vic.

Her piano quintet, written in 1916, but first performed in 1920, was a success. She continued to compose opera and songs, and to produce concerts, into the 1920s.

From the early 1920s, Martha Mundt lived in Geneva, having joined the secretariat of the International Labour Organization (ILO) as an information officer on the strength of the recommendation of leading German socialist Eduard Bernstein to the ILO director, Albert Thomas. Mundt became the ILO's officer dealing with employment issues for women and children, and the ILO's liaison with feminist organisations. She represented the ILO at a number of international congresses around Europe. Maddison often travelled to Geneva to visit Mundt there.

Maddison died in Ealing, London in 1929. The scores for the compositions she created during her stays in Paris and Berlin, and for the music she created for the Glastonbury Festivals, seem to have been lost.

Works
Selected works include:

Operas
Der Talisman (1910)
Ippolita in the Hills (1926)

Ballets
The Children of Lir (1920)

Chamber music
Piano quintet (1916)

Vocal
Deux Mélodies (1893), text by Sully Prudhomme and Coppée
Twelve Songs (1895), text by Rossetti, Shelley, Swinburne, Tennyson and others
Little Fishes silver (1915), text translated from Bierbaum by Maddison
Mary at Play (1915), text translated from Bruch by Maddison
The Ballade of Fair Agneta (1915), text translated from Miegel by Maddison
Lament of the caged Lark (1924), text by L. N. Duddington
Tears (1924), text translated from Wang Sen-Ju by Cranmer-Byng
The Heart of the Wood (1924), text translated from anonymous Irish poem by Augusta, Lady Gregory
The Poet complains (1924), text translated from anonymous Irish poem by Augusta, Lady Gregory

References

External links
LiederNet Archive

1862 births
1929 deaths
British Romantic composers
British classical composers
British women classical composers
British ballet composers
British opera composers
LGBT classical composers
Musicians from London
19th-century classical composers
20th-century classical composers
20th-century British composers
Women opera composers
20th-century English women musicians
19th-century British composers
20th-century women composers
19th-century women composers